Robert J. Campbell (born June 24, 1966, in Charlottetown, Prince Edward Island) is a Canadian curler.

Campbell has skipped teams in six Briers (1991, 1993, 1995, 1997, 1999 and 2003); played third at the 2002 Brier for John Likely and played lead in 2007 for Peter Gallant, and was an alternate in the 2001 Brier.

Campbell has never won a Brier, but has skipped Prince Edward Island to two Canadian Mixed Curling Championships, in 1989 and the 2011 championship.

Campbell is a custom photo framer at PEI Photo Lab.

External links
 

1966 births
Curlers from Prince Edward Island
Living people
Sportspeople from Charlottetown
Canadian male curlers
Canadian mixed curling champions